Diwaran is a  island in Coron municipality in Palawan, Philippines. It has fine white sand.

Banyan Tree Resort Holdings, a Singapore based firm, was scheduled to have their 240 million dollar resort's first phase completed in the island by 2012. However, the project did not push through.

References

See also

 List of islands of the Philippines

Calamian Islands
Beaches of the Philippines